Camas County is a county in the southern portion of the U.S. state of Idaho. The county seat and largest city is Fairfield. The county was established  in 1917 by the Idaho Legislature with a partition of Blaine County on February 6. It is named for the camas root, or Camassia, a lily-like plant with an edible bulb found in the region, that Native Americans and settlers used as a food source. As of the 2020 census, the population was 1,077, making it the second-least populous county in the state, after Clark County.

Camas County is part of the Hailey, ID Micropolitan Statistical Area.

History
Native presence on the Camas Prairie dates back over 11,000 years ago. The Shoshoni, Northern Piute, and Nez Perce migrated annually to the Camas Prairie to gather camas and yampa for their winter food storage. Explorer, Donald Mackenzie discovered the Camas Prairie by 1820 and the area slowly grew in importance as a travel route. Military escorts for wagon trains headed to Oregon started using the route through the Camas Prairie in 1852. The route was later named Goodale Cutoff, for Timothy Goodale who first brought migrants through the Camas Prairie in 1862. When the cavalry was stationed at Fort Boise the southern portion of the Camas Prairie was an important feeding ground for their horses. In 1869, a treaty ratified by the US Senate provided a portion of the "Kansas Prairie" instead of the "Camas Prairie" to be retained by the Bannock Indians. The error may have made by the person who transcribed the treaty. Since there was no "Kansas Prairie" in Idaho, the treaty rights of the Bannocks were ignored. When they found a few settlers were allowing their hogs to feed on the Bannocks' traditional food source, the camas root, they objected (without results), which was a major cause of the Bannock War of 1878.

The Camas Prairie was initially entirely within Alturas County when initial settlement started following the Bannock War. While the Lava mining district near Fairfield was active in the 1880s, Camas County's settlements were primarily agricultural. By the fall of 1881, over 60 farming operations were in existence. Town settlements at Crichton and Soldier occurred almost simultaneously in 1884. Corral was settled no later than 1886. The Camas Prairie became part of Logan County when it was formed in 1889 with the mountainous area north of the prairie remaining within Alturas County. At the 1890 Census, Alturas County contained the Little Smoky precinct with 95 residents while Logan County contained the Corral, Crichton, Soldier, and Spring Creek precincts with a combined population of 805. In 1891, the Idaho Legislature attempted to transfer all five Camas precincts to a new county named Alta. The Idaho Supreme Court found the act unconstitutional. Blaine County included all five Camas precincts when it was organized in 1895. The settlement at Crichton was abandoned in 1896. The decline at Crichton, led to a slight decline to 836 residents within the five Camas precincts at the 1890 census. By 1910, the precincts more than doubled to reach a population of 1,804 residents. A railroad reached the Camas Prairie in 1911 and ran through what is now Fairfield. The railroad's arrival led the majority of settlement in Soldier to locate to what became known as Fairfield.

Geography

Adjacent counties
Blaine County - east
Lincoln County - southeast
Gooding County - south
Elmore County - west

Demographics

2000 census
As of the census of 2000, there were 991 people, 396 households, and 287 families living in the county. The population density was 0.8 people per square mile (0.3/km2). There were 601 housing units at an average density of 0.6 per square mile (0.2/km2). The racial makeup of the county was 95.16% White, 1.21% Black or African American, 0.30% Native American, 0.20% Asian, 0.91% from other races, and 2.22% from two or more races. 5.55% of the population were Hispanic or Latino of any race. 20.5% were of German, 18.1% American, 15.4% English and 7.4% Irish ancestry.

There were 396 households, out of which 30.80% had children under the age of 18 living with them, 65.20% were married couples living together, 4.50% had a female householder with no husband present, and 27.50% were non-families. 22.20% of all households were made up of individuals, and 8.30% had someone living alone who was 65 years of age or older. The average household size was 2.49 and the average family size was 2.92.

In the county, the population was spread out, with 24.70% under the age of 18, 6.60% from 18 to 24, 28.20% from 25 to 44, 27.50% from 45 to 64, and 13.00% who were 65 years of age or older. The median age was 40 years. For every 100 females there were 104.80 males. For every 100 females age 18 and over, there were 102.20 males.

The median income for a household in the county was $34,167, and the median income for a family was $40,156. Males had a median income of $30,500 versus $21,563 for females. The per capita income for the county was $19,550. About 7.20% of families and 8.30% of the population were below the poverty line, including 7.20% of those under age 18 and 8.50% of those age 65 or over.

2010 census
As of the 2010 United States Census, there were 1,117 people, 487 households, and 326 families living in the county. The racial makeup of the county was 94.1% white, 0.5% American Indian, 0.3% black or African American, 0.1% Asian, 1.8% from other races, and 3.2% from two or more races. Those of Hispanic or Latino origin made up 6.7% of the population. In terms of ancestry, 24.8% were German, 20.2% were American, 15.1% were English, 8.8% were Irish, and 7.3% were Swedish.

Of the 487 households, 28.1% had children under the age of 18 living with them, 56.3% were married couples living together, 5.1% had a female householder with no husband present, 33.1% were non-families, and 28.3% of all households were made up of individuals. The average household size was 2.29 and the average family size was 2.77. The median age was 44.3 years.

The median income for a household in the county was $44,145 and the median income for a family was $43,092. Males had a median income of $39,022 versus $25,938 for females. The per capita income for the county was $19,659. About 14.1% of families and 16.3% of the population were below the poverty line, including 28.0% of those under age 18 and 4.0% of those age 65 or over.

Communities

City
 Fairfield

Unincorporated communities
 Corral
 Hill City
 Soldier

Politics
With its small and mostly white population, Camas County is one of the most consistently Republican counties in Idaho, having last backed Democrats in 1960, when it voted for John F. Kennedy. The county is also well known for its large third-party voteshares in elections. In 1992, Independent Ross Perot got 29.84% of the vote. In 1996, Reform Party Ross Perot got 17.46%. In 2000, Reform Party candidate Patrick Buchanan got 3.94%. In 2016, Evan McMullin got 5.59%.

Transportation

Recreation

See also
National Register of Historic Places listings in Camas County, Idaho
County Assessor Parcel Map

Notes

References

 

 
1917 establishments in Idaho
Populated places established in 1917